Matías Ezequiel Sarraute (born October 1, 1990 in Mar del Plata, Argentina) is an Argentine footballer currently playing for Deportes Concepción of the Primera División B in Chile.

Teams
  Aldosivi de Mar del Plata, 2010-2013
  Alvarado de Mar del Plata, 2013-2014
  Deportes Concepción, 2014–present

References
 
 

1990 births
Living people
Argentine footballers
Argentine expatriate footballers
Aldosivi footballers
Deportes Concepción (Chile) footballers
Primera B de Chile players
Expatriate footballers in Chile
Association footballers not categorized by position
Sportspeople from Mar del Plata